Narcos is an American crime drama television series about the Colombian drug cartels and the DEA's efforts to shut them down. It was created by Chris Brancato, Carlo Bernard and Doug Miro, and produced by Gaumont International Television and distributed by Netflix. Its companion series Narcos: Mexico was released after the original series ended.

The following list shows the characters who had appeared both series. Most of the cast of the first 2 seasons did not return in the third season, meanwhile Narcos: Mexico features a totally different cast, although some of the cast of the original series reprise their roles. Pedro Pascal is the only actor to have main appearance in all three seasons of the original series, while José María Yazpik and Alejandro Edda are the only actors to have main appearances in all three seasons of Narcos: Mexico. In addition, Alberto Ammann is the only actor to have appearances in all six seasons of both series combined.

Overview

Main cast
  = Main cast (credited) 
  = Recurring cast (3+)
  = Guest cast (1-2)

Recurring cast
  = Recurring cast (3+)
  = Guest cast (1-2)

Main characters

Introduced in Narcos

Pablo Escobar
Pablo Escobar played by Wagner Moura (seasons 1-2), Colombian drug lord and head of the Medellín Cartel. He is married to Tata and has a close relationship with his mother and his cousin, Gustavo. Moura also made guest appearances in the first and third seasons of Narcos: Mexico.

Steven Murphy
Steven Murphy played by Boyd Holbrook (seasons 1-2), a DEA agent assigned to Colombia. He is married to Connie who has trouble adjusting to their life in Colombia. He serves as the narrator for the first two seasons of Narcos.

Javier Peña
Javier Peña played by Pedro Pascal (seasons 1-3), a DEA agent and Murphy’s partner. He serves as the narrator for the third season and final season of Narcos.

Connie Murphy
Connie Murphy played by Joanna Christie (seasons 1-2), Steve’s wife, a nurse who works at a local hospital in Colombia.

Colonel Carrillo
Colonel Horacio Carrillo played by Maurice Compte (season 1; recurring season 2), colonel of the Republic of Colombia and leader of the Search Bloc police unit.

Jorge Ochoa
Jorge Ochoa played by André Mattos (season 1), founding member and former leader of the Medellín cartel.

Fabio Ochoa
Fabio Ochoa played by Robert Urbina (season 1), a founding member and former leader of the Medellín cartel and Jorge’s brother.

La Quica
Juan Diego "La Quica" Díaz played by Diego Cataño (season 1; recurring season 2), an assassin working for the Medellín cartel.

Poison
Roberto "Poison" Ramos played by Jorge A. Jimenez (season 1; guest season 2), a hit man hired by the Medellín cartel. Jimenez also made a guest appearance in the first season of Narcos: Mexico.

Tata Escobar
Tata Escobar played by Paulina Gaitán (seasons 1-2), Pablo Escobar’s wife and mother of his two children.

Hermilda Gaviria
Hermilda Gaviria played by Paulina García (seasons 1-2), Pablo’s mother who he has a close relationship to.

Valeria Vélez
Valeria Vélez played by Stephanie Sigman (season 1; recurring season 2), a Colombian journalist who is Escobar’s mistress.

Fernando Duque
Fernando Duque played by Bruno Bichir (seasons 1-2), a
Colombian lawyer representing Pablo Escobar.

César Gaviria
César Gaviria played by Raúl Méndez (seasons 1-2), a Colombian politician who becomes the 28th President of Colombia.

Eduardo Sandoval
Eduardo Sandoval played by Manolo Cardona (seasons 1-2), the Vice Minister of Justice for President Gaviria’s administration.

Judy Moncada
Judy Moncada played by Cristina Umaña (season 2; guest season 1), a former leader of the Medellín cartel who wants revenge on Pablo Escobar for the murder of her husband. She is a founding member of the Los Pepes hit squad, designed to destroy Escobar’s organization.

Bill Stechner
Bill Stechner played by Eric Lange (seasons 2-3), the CIA station chief in Colombia. Lange also made guest appearances in the first and second seasons of Narcos: Mexico.

Claudia Messina
Claudia Messina played by Florencia Lozano (season 2), a high-ranking DEA agent who acts as Murphy and Peña’s supervisor.

Gilberto Rodriguez
Gilberto Rodriguez played by Damián Alcázar (seasons 2-3), leader of the Cali cartel and one of Escobar’s primary rivals. Alcázar also made a guest appearance in the third season of Narcos: Mexico.

Pacho Herrera
Helmer "Pacho" Herrera played by Alberto Ammann (seasons 2-3; recurring season 1), a leader of the Cali cartel with connections to the Mexican drug trade. Ammann also made a guest appearance in the first season of Narcos: Mexico and was a series regular for seasons 2 and 3.

Miguel Rodriguez Orejuela
Miguel Rodriguez Orejuela played by Francisco Denis (seasons 2-3), a leader and founding member of the Cali cartel and Gilberto’s brother. Denis also made a guest appearance in the first season of Narcos: Mexico.

Chepe Santacruz
José "Chepe" Santacruz-Londoño played by Pêpê Rapazote (season 3), a leader and founding member of the Cali cartel who oversees their operation in New York. Rapazote also made guest appearances in first and third seasons of Narcos: Mexico.

Jorge Salcedo Cabrera
Jorge Salcedo Cabrera played by Matias Varela (season 3), head of security for the Cali cartel. Varela also made a guest appearance in the second season of
Narcos: Mexico.

Guillermo Palomari
Guillermo Palomari played by Javier Cámara (season 3), the chief accountant for the Cali cartel.

David Rodríguez
David Rodríguez played by Arturo Castro (season 3), an enforcer for the Cali cartel and Miguel’s son.

María Salazar
María Salazar played by Andrea Londo (season 3), the wife of a Colombian drug lord affiliated with the North Valley cartel. She becomes romantically involved with Miguel.

Christina Jurado
Christina Jurado played by Kerry Bishé (season 3), the American wife of a banker associated with the Cali cartel who becomes a target for the DEA.

Chris Feistl
Chris Feistl played by Michael Stahl-David (season 3), a DEA agent working under Peña.

Daniel Van Ness
Daniel Van Ness played by Matt Whelan (season 3), a DEA agent partnered with Feistl.

Amado Carrillo Fuentes
Amado Carrillo Fuentes played by José María Yazpik (season 3), a Mexican drug lord known as the "Lord of the Skies". He is business partners with Pacho and Félix and is Don Neto’s nephew. Yazpik was also a series regular for all three seasons of Narcos: Mexico.

Introduced in Narcos: Mexico

Kiki Camarena
Enrique "Kiki" Camarena Salazar played by Michael Peña (season 1), a DEA agent who garners intel on Félix’s rising organization. He is married to Mika and together they have three children.

Miguel Ángel Félix Gallardo
Miguel Ángel Félix Gallardo played by Diego Luna (seasons 1-2; guest season 3), the leader and founder of the Guadalajara Cartel, who pioneered the modern Mexican drug trade.

Rafael Caro Quintero
Rafael "Rafa" Caro Quintero played by Tenoch Huerta (season 1; guest season 2), Félix’s friend and business partner, he is a founding member of the Guadalajara cartel.

Mika Camarena
Mika Camarena played by Alyssa Diaz (season 1), Kiki’s wife who is pregnant with their third child when he gets stationed to Guadalajara.

Don Neto
Ernesto "Don Neto" Fonseca Carrillo played by Joaquín Cosío (season 1; guest season 2; recurring season 3), Félix’s business partner and founding member of the Guadalajara cartel. He is Amado’s uncle and mentor.

Jaime Kuykendall
 James "Jaime" Kuykendall played by Matt Letscher (seasons 1 & 3; guest season 2), head of the Guadalajara bureau of the DEA and Kiki’s supervisor.

Salvador Osuna Nava
Salvador Osuna Nava played by Ernesto Alterio (season 1), Director-General of the Mexican Dirección Federal de Seguridad who becomes associated with Félix.

El Chapo
Joaquín "El Chapo" Guzmán played by Alejandro Edda (seasons 1-3), a member of the Sinaloa cartel who begins rising the ranks of the drug trade.

Maria Elvira
Maria Elvira played by Fernanda Urrejola (seasons 1-2), Félix’s wife and the daughter of a Mexican drug lord.

Isabella Bautista
Isabella Bautista played by Teresa Ruiz (seasons 1-2), Félix’s friend and business associate.

Butch Sears
Butch Sears played by Aaron Staton (season 1), a DEA agent stationed in Guadalajara.

Roger Knapp
Roger Knapp played by Lenny Jacobson (season 1), a DEA agent stationed in Guadalajara.

Pablo Acosta
Pablo Acosta played by Gerardo Taracena (seasons 1-2), the leader of the Juarez Cartel.

Commander González Calderoni
Commander Guillermo González Calderoni played by Julio Cesar Cedillo (seasons 1-2), the commander of the Mexican Federal Judicial Police.

Walt Breslin
Walt Breslin played by Scoot McNairy (seasons 2-3; recurring season 1), a DEA agent and the leader of Operation Leyenda. He serves as the narrator of the first two seasons of Narcos: Mexico.

Benjamín Arellano Félix
Benjamín Arellano Félix played by Alfonso Dosal (seasons 2-3; recurring season 1), the leader of the Tijuana Cartel, Enedina and Ramón’s older brother.

Enedina Arellano Félix
Enedina Arellano Félix played by Mayra Hermosillo (seasons 2-3), a high-ranking member of the Tijuana cartel, Benjamín and Ramón’s sister. She initially begins an alliance with Isabella, before joining her family’s business.

Ramón Arellano Félix
Ramón Arellano Félix played by Manuel Masalva (seasons 2-3; recurring season 1), an enforcer and high-ranking member of the Tijuana cartel, Benjamín and Enedina’s younger brother.

Danilo Garza
Danilo Garza played by Miguel Rodarte (season 2), a Mexican police officer and member of Operation Leyenda.

Kenny Moss
Kenny Moss played by Alex Knight (season 2; guest season 1), a DEA agent and member of Operation Leyenda.

Sal Orozco
Sal Orozco played by Jesse Garcia (season 2), a DEA agent and member of Operation Leyenda.

Daryl Petsky
Daryl Petsky played by Matt Biedel (season 2), a DEA agent and member of Operation Leyenda.

Ossie Mejía
Ossie Mejía played by Jero Medina (season 2), a Mexican police officer and member of Operation Leyenda.

Amat Palacios
Amat Palacios played by Alberto Zeni (season 2), a Mexican police officer and member of Operation Leyenda.

Héctor Luis Palma Salazar
Héctor Luis "El Güero" Palma Salazar played by Gorka Lasaosa (seasons 2-3; recurring season 1), a high-ranking member and sometimes leader of the Sinaloa cartel.

Enrique Clavel
Enrique Clavel played by Andres Londono (season 2), Félix’s right-hand man who becomes involved with Guadalupe, Salazar’s wife.

Juan García Abrego
Juan García Abrego played by Flavio Medina (seasons 2-3), the leader of the Gulf cartel and Guerra’s nephew.

Victor Tapia
Victor Tapia played by Luis Gerardo Méndez (season 3), a Juarez police officer who becomes drawn to series of killings involving young women.

Andrea Nuñez
Andrea Nuñez played by Luisa Rubino (season 3), a young journalist investigating the activities of the cartels for "La Voz de Tijuana". She serves as the narrator for the third and final season of Narcos: Mexico.

General Rebollo
General Jesús Gutiérrez Rebollo played by Jose Zuniga (season 3), a Mexican military general working against the cartels.

Steve Sheridan
Steve Sheridan played by Beau Mirchoff (season 3), a DEA agent working under Kuykendall.

Dani
Dani played by Kristen Gutoskie (season 3), Walt’s girlfriend who is reluctant in their relationship.

David Barron Corona
David Barron Corona played by Bobby Soto (season 3; recurring season 2), a high-ranking member of the Logan Heights Gang and hit-man for the Tijuana cartel.

Alex Hodoyan
Alex Hodoyan played by Lorenzo Ferro (season 3), a member of Ramón's Narcojuniors gang, a group composed of young rich kids who act as enforcers for the Tijuana cartel.

Ramon Salgado
Ramon Salgado played by Alejandro Furth (season 3), co-founder of "La Voz de Tijuana" and Andrea's boss.

El Mayo
Ismael "El Mayo" Zambada played by Alberto Guerra (season 3), an independent drug trafficker who uses his fishing business as a front. His business becomes an asset to the competing cartels.

Recurring characters

Introduced in Narcos

Recurring guest stars
 Gonzalo Rodriguez Gacha played by Luis Guzmán (season 1), a founding member and former leader of the Medellín cartel.
 Gustavo Gaviria played by Juan Pablo Raba (season 1; guest season 2), Pablo’s cousin and right-hand man. He is a founding member of the Medellín cartel.
 Carlos Lehder played by Juan Riedinger (season 1), a drug trafficker and high-ranking member of the Medellín cartel.
 CIA officer played by Richard T. Jones (season 1; guest season 2), a member of Murphy’s task force.
 Elisa Álvarez played by Ana de la Reguera (season 1), the co-leader of guerrilla faction 19th of April Movement (M-19).
 Ambassador Noonan played by Danielle Kennedy (season 1), the United States Ambassador deployed to Colombia under President Ronald Reagan.
 Colonel Lou Wysession played by Patrick St. Esprit (season 1; guest season 2), a U.S. Marine Corps colonel and leader of a military group in Colombia.
 Diana Turbay played by Gabriela de la Garza (season 1), a Colombian journalist kidnapped by the Medellín cartel.
 Limón played by Leynar Gómez (season 2), a taxi driver from Medellín who becomes Escobar's personal driver and one of his sicarios, based on Alvaro de Jesús Agudelo (El Limón). 
 Maritza played by Martina García (season 2), a young mother and an old friend of Limón's who gets roped into unwittingly helping Escobar.
 Ambassador Arthur Crosby played by Brett Cullen (seasons 2-3), Noonan’s replacement as the American Ambassador in Colombia.
 Edward Jacoby played by Konstantin Melikhov (season 2), a U.S. intelligence officer attached to Centra Spike.
 Franklin Jurado played by Miguel Angel Silvestre (season 3), Christina’s husband and a banker associated with the Cali cartel.

Recurring co-stars
 Sureshot played by Ariel Sierra (season 1; guest season 2), a sicario for the Medellín cartel.
 Nelson "El Negrito" Hernández played by Julián Díaz (seasons 1-2), an enforcer for Pablo Escobar. He is also referred to as "Blackie" and is based on Jorge "El Negro" Pabón. Díaz also makes a guest appearance on the first season of Narcos: Mexico.
 Marta Ochoa played by Carolina Gaitán (season 1), Jorge and Fabio’s younger sister who is kidnapped by M-19.
 Agent Owen played by Thaddeus Phillips (season 1; guest season 2), a CIA agent and member of Murphy’s task force.
 Luis Carlos Galán played by Juan Pablo Espinosa (season 1), a Colombian politician who ran for the Presidency of Colombia.
 Juan Pablo Escobar played by Juan Sebastian Murcia (seasons 1-2), Pablo and Tata’s eldest son.
 Trujillo played by Jorge Monterrosa (seasons 1-2; guest season 3), a Colombian police officer who assists the task force.
 Alberto Suarez played by Julián Beltrán (season 1), a corrupt Colombian police officer.
 Fernando Galeano played by Orlando Valenzuela (season 1), a high-ranking member of the Medellín cartel in charge of distribution.
 Kiko Moncada played by Christian Tappan (season 1), Judy’s husband and a high-ranking member of the Medellín cartel partnered with Fernando.
 Marina Ochoa played by Laura Perico (season 1), Jorge and Fabio’s younger sister who becomes romantically involved with Gustavo.
 Ana Gaviria played by Vera Mercado (season 1; guest season 2), Cesar’s wife and First Lady of Colombia.
 Navegante played by Juan Sebastián Calero (seasons 1-3), a high-ranking member and assassin for the Cali cartel. Calero also has a recurring role in the second season of Narcos: Mexico.
 Velasco played by Alejandro Buitrago (season 2; guest season 1), a lieutenant for the Medellín cartel.
 Jairo played by Jairo Ordoñez (season 2; guest season 1), a sicario for the Medellín cartel.
 Diego "Don Berna" Murillo Bejarano played by Mauricio Cujar (season 2; guest season 3), a former associate of Pablo Escobar allied with Judy Moncada. He is a founding member of Los Pepes. 
 Ricardo Prisco played by Federico Rivera (season 2), a Colombian doctor and leader of the Los Priscos criminal organization.
 Manuela Escobar played by María José Sanchez (season 2; guest season 1), Pablo and Tata’s youngest daughter.
 Carlos Castaño Gil played by Mauricio Mejía (season 2; guest season 3), a Colombian paramilitary leader and founding member of Los Pepes.
 Fidel Castaño played by Gustavo Angarita Jr. (season 2; guest season 3), a Colombian paramilitary leader, Carlos’ brother, and a founding member of Los Pepes.
 Gustavo de Greiff played by Germán Jaramillo (season 2), Attorney General of Colombia during Gaviria’s administration.
 Colonel Hugo Martínez played by Juan Pablo Shuk (seasons 2-3), a Colombian police colonel and new commander of the Search Bloc.
 Hugo Martinez Jr. played by Sebastián Vega (season 2), a Colombian police officer and Colonel Martinez’s son.
 General Diego Vargas played by Alvaro García (seasons 2-3), General of the Colombian National Police.
 Carlo Córdova played by Andrés Crespo (season 3), former head of security for the Cali cartel who employed Jorge Salcedo.
 Flaco played by Arnold Cantillo (season 3), an enforcer for the Cali cartel.
 Orlando Henao Montoya played by Julian Arango (season 3), leader of the North Valley cartel. Arango also makes guest appearances in the second and third seasons of Narcos: Mexico.
 Enrique played by Carrell Lasso (season 3), a member of the Cali cartel’s security team.
 Claudio Salazar played by Carlos Camacho (season 3), a high-ranking member of the North Valley cartel.
 Dario played by Roberto Cano (season 3), a sicario for the Cali cartel and David’s right-hand man.
 Manuel played by Maurho Jimenez (season 3), Pacho’s lover. Jimenez also makes a guest appearance in the third season of Narcos: Mexico.
 Agent Neil Stoddard played by  Raymond Ablack (season 3), the DEA deputy country attaché stationed in Colombia.
 Paola Salcedo played by Taliana Vargas (season 3), Jorge Salcedo’s wife and a Colombian lawyer.
 Vera Salcedo played by Juana Álvarez (season 3), Jorge and Paola’s daughter.
 Patricía Pallomari played by Lina Castrillón (season 3), Guillermo’s wife who is unfaithful in their marriage.
 Wilber Varela played by Girolly Gutiérrez (season 3), a high-ranking member of the North Valley cartel and Orlando’s right-hand man. Gutiérrez also makes a guest appearance in the second season of Narcos: Mexico.
 Carolina Álvarez played by  Margarita Rosa de Francisco (season 3), a Colombian journalist who assists Peña against the Cali cartel.
 Alma Salcedo played by Bella Barragán (season 3), Jorge and Paola’s daughter.
 Nicolas Rodriguez played by Sebastián Eslava (season 3), Gilberto’s son and a lawyer who works for the Cali cartel.
 Alvaro Herrera played by Edgar Prada (season 3), Pacho’s younger brother.
 Fernando Botero Zea played by Luis Mesa (season 3), Minister of Defense in Colombia under President Ernesto Samper.
 General Rosso José Serrano played by Gastón Velandia (season 3), a former Colombian police general and a Commander of the Search Bloc.

Introduced in Narcos: Mexico

Recurring guest stars
 Juan José "El Azul" Esparragoza Moreno played by Fermin Martinez (seasons 1-3), a co-founder of the Guadalajara cartel and a former Director-General of the DFS.
 Cochiloco played by Andrés Almeida (seasons 1-2), a Mexican drug trafficker working for the Guadalajara cartel.
 Francisco Rafael Arellano Félix played by Francisco Barreiro (seasons 1-3), the eldest brother of Arellano Felix family and a high-ranking member of the Tijuana cartel.
 Ed Heath played by Clark Freeman (seasons 1-2), Director of Operations of the DEA in Mexico.
 Humberto Álvarez Machaín / Doctor Delgado played by Emilio Guerrero (season 1; guest season 2), a Mexican physician involved in the torture of Agent Camarena.
 Juan Matta-Ballesteros played by Vladimir Cruz (season 1; guest season 2), a Honduran drug trafficker who connected the Colombian cocaine trade with the Mexican drug cartels.
 Mr. X / Andrés played by Alejandro Bracho (seasons 1-2; guest season 3), the Mexican Secretary of Defense who provided protection for the Guadalajara cartel.
 Ruben Zuno Arce played by Milton Cortés (season 2; guest season 1), a wealthy Mexican businessman and Andrés’ nephew. He is associated with the Guadalajara cartel and was involved in Agent Camarena’s murder.
 Guadalupe "Lupita" Leija Serrano played by Viviana Serna (season 2), Héctor’s wife and Enrique’s lover.
 Juan Nepomuceno Guerra played by Jesús Ochoa (season 2; guest season 3), the founder and co-leader of the Gulf cartel and Abrego’s uncle.
 Mimi Webb Miller played by Sosie Bacon (season 2), an American rancher and Pablo Acosta’s love interest.
 Javier Arellano Félix played by José Julián (seasons 2-3), the youngest of the Arellano Felix siblings and an enforcer for the Tijuana cartel.
 Eduardo Arellano Félix played by Sebastián Buitrón (seasons 2-3), a member of the Arellano Felix family and a high-ranking member of the Tijuana cartel.
 Carlos Hank Gonzalez played by Manuel Uriza (season 3), a Mexican politician and influential businessman.
 Hortencia Tapia played by Damayanti Quintanar (season 3), Victor’s wife who works in a factory.
 Craig Mills played by James Earl (season 3), a DEA agent and Sheridan’s partner.
 Everardo Arturo “Kitty” Paez played by Benito Antonio Martinez Ocasio (season 3), an enforcer for the Tijuana cartel and a member of Ramon’s "Narcojuniors" gang.
 Marta Linares played by Yessica Borroto (season 3), a Cuban nightclub performer and Amado’s love interest.
 Jack Dorian played by Eric Etebari (season 3), head of the Tijuana bureau of the DEA.

Recurring co-stars
 Tomas Morlet played by Horacio García Rojas (season 1), a corrupt Mexican DFS agent working under Nava.
 Sammy Alvarez played by Memo Villegas (season 1), a former Mexican police officer and Don Neto’s right-hand man.
 Governor Leopoldo Celis played by Rodrigo Murray (season 1), Governor of Sinaloa and a member of the PRI.
 Comandante Méndez played by Edison Ruiz (season 1), a Mexican Federal Judicial Police officer.
 Kiki Camarena Jr. played by Alessandro Borrelli (season 1), Kiki and Mika’s oldest son.
 Miguel Gallardo Jr. played by Jonathan Ochoa (seasons 1-2), Félix and Maria’s son.
 Abril Gallardo played by Ivana Plantier (seasons 1-2), Félix and Maria’s daughter.
 Suzy played by Natasha Esca (season 1), the receptionist at the DEA’s Guadalajara office.
 Falcón played by Luis Roberto Guzmán (season 1), a Cuban drug lord operating in Mexico and Félix’s rival.
 Cuco played by Edmundo Vargas (season 1), Rafa’s right-hand man and a member of the Guadalajara cartel.
 Sofia Conesa played by Tessa Ia (season 1), the daughter  of the Mexican Secretary of Education and Rafa’s love interest.
 Tony played by Mark Kubr (season 1), an American Vietnam War veteran who works as a personal bodyguard for various drug lords.
 Manuel Torres Félix played by Joshua Okamoto (season 1), a high-ranking member of the Sinaloa cartel.
 Thomas Buehl played by Mike Doyle (season 1), an American accountant living in Texas who manages Félix’s finances.
 Ana Kuykendall played by Tania Arredondo (season 1), Jaime’s wife.
 John Gavin played by Yul Vazquez (season 1), the United States Ambassador to Mexico.
 Daniela Gallardo played by Alejandra Guilmant (season 2; guest season 1), Félix’s mistress. She later becomes his wife after his divorce from Maria.
 Rafael Aguilar Guajardo played by Noé Hernández (season 2; guest season 3), a founding member of the Juarez cartel.
 Marco De Haro played by Alfonso Borbolla (season 2), Pablo Acosta’s head of security.
 Isabel Arellano Félix played by Luna Beltran (seasons 2-3), a member of the Arellano Félix family and the Tijuana cartel.
 Alicia María Arellano Félix played by Marilyn Uribe (seasons 2-3), a member of the Arellano Félix family and money launderer for the Tijuana cartel.
 Manny played by Erick Israel Consuelo (seasons 2-3), Amado’s right-hand man and a member of the Juarez cartel.
 President Elect / Carlos Salinas de Gortari played by Adolfo Madera (season 2; guest season 3), President Elect of Mexico and a member of the PRI. Credited only as "President Elect".
 The Brother / Raúl Salinas de Gortari played by Mauricio Isaac (season 2; guest season 3), a Mexican businessman and the elder brother of the President Elect. Credited only as "The Brother".
 Cecilia Rosado played by Mariana Treviño (season 2), the President Elect’s campaign manager and a member of the PRI.
 Rogelio played by Markin López (season 3), a Juarez police officer and Victor’s partner.
 Ruth Arellano Félix played by Adriana Llabrés (season 3; guest season 2), Benjamín’s wife and mother to his children.
 Alfredo Hodoyan played by Iván Aragón (season 3), Alex’s older brother and a member of the Narcojuniors.
 Marcos Santos played by Francisco Rubio (season 3), Andrea’s coworker at La Voz de Tijuana.
 Claudio Vazquez played by Claudio Lafarga (season 3), Enedina’s husband.
 Isabella played by Ana Cecilia Azuela (season 3), Andrea’s coworker.
 Isaac played by Nicolás de Llaca (season 3), Andrea’s coworker.
 Arturo Beltran Leyva played by Diego Calva (season 3), a high-ranking member of the Sinaloa cartel and Chapo’s right-hand man.
 Vicente Carrillo Fuentes played by Fernando Bonilla (season 3), Amado’s older brother and a high-ranking member of the Juarez cartel.
 Gerardo Corral played by Eugenio Rubio (season 3), a Mexican accountant working for the Juarez cartel.

Notable guests

Introduced in Narcos
 A.J. Buckley as Kevin Brady (season 1), a DEA agent and Steve Murphy’s partner.
 Luis Gnecco as Cucaracha or "Cockroach" (né Mateo Moreno) (season  1), the Chilean chemist who first introduced Escobar to cocaine trafficking.
 Jon-Michael Ecker as El León (seasons 1-2), a drug trafficker based in Miami who works for the Medellín cartel.
 Adria Arjona as Helena Sotomayor (season 1), a top-class prostitute from Bogotá who acts as a spy for the DEA and the Search Bloc.
 Rafael Cebrián as Alejandro Ayala (season 1), co-leader of M-19 and Elisa’s boyfriend.
 Adan Canto as Rodrigo Lara Bonilla (season 1), a Colombian lawyer and politician.
 Dylan Bruno as Barry Seal (season 1), an American drug smuggler working for the Medellín cartel who uses the alias "McPickle".
 Alfredo Castro as Abel Escobar (season 2), Pablo’s father.
 Matthew Glave as Mike Spencer (season 2), a high-ranking member of the DEA Operations division.
 Edward James Olmos as Chucho Peña (season 3), Javier’s father.
 Shea Whigham as Agent Duffy (season 3), a DEA agent tracking the Cali cartel.
 Nicholas Gonzalez as Agent Lopez (season 3), a DEA agent and Duffy’s partner.
 Gabriel Iglesias as a Dominican  gangster (season 3), who fights with Chepe in New York.
 Glenn Morshower as Senator Martin (season 3), a United States Senator.

Introduced in Narcos: Mexico

References

Narcos
Narcos
Narcos